Rebecca O'Brien (born 1957) is a BAFTA-winning film producer, known especially for her work with Ken Loach. O'Brien was born in London, England.

Together with Loach and scriptwriter Paul Laverty, she runs the production company Sixteen Films, formed in 2002. The trio received an "outstanding contribution" award from BAFTA Scotland in November 2016.

Her career began in theatre and children's television and her early cinema work includes My Beautiful Laundrette (1985), on which she was location manager, and Bean (1997), which she co-produced.

She was co-producer on Loach's Hidden Agenda (1990) and sole producer on his Land and Freedom (1995) and on many of his subsequent films, two of which, The Wind That Shakes the Barley (2006) and I, Daniel Blake (2016) received the Palme d'Or at the Cannes Film Festival. Laverty, Loach and O'Brien won the 2017 BAFTA Award for Outstanding British Film, for I, Daniel Blake.

She served as a member of the board of the UK Film Council, until that body's dissolution in 2010, and of the UK Film Industry Training Board. She is a board member of PACT, the trade body for independent film production companies in the United Kingdom, and of the European Film Academy. She is also a member of The British Screen Advisory Council.

Filmography

References

External links 

 
 
 
 2012 interview with the Highlands of Scotland Film Commission
 Cannes Winner Ken Loach’s Producer Rebecca O’Brien on Their 30-Year Film Partnership'' - 2016 interview with 'Variety'

British film producers
British women film producers
1957 births
Living people
Businesspeople from London
BAFTA winners (people)